"Deacon Blues" is a song written by Walter Becker and Donald Fagen in 1976 and recorded by their group Steely Dan on their 1977 album Aja. It peaked at number 19 on the Billboard charts and number 17 on the U.S. Cash Box Top 100 in June 1978. It also reached #40 on the Easy Listening chart. In Canada, it peaked at #14, a position it occupied for two weeks, and #20 Adult Contemporary. In 2021, it was listed at No. 214 on Rolling Stone's "Top 500 Greatest Songs of All Time".

Background
Donald Fagen said of the song's opening lines and theme:

The song was largely written at Fagen's house in Malibu and was prompted by his observation that "if a college football team like the University of Alabama could have a grandiose name like the 'Crimson Tide' the nerds and losers should be entitled to a grandiose name as well." The song's protagonist, muses Fagen, is somewhat "autobiographical in that it reflected the dreams [Fagen and Becker had] about becoming jazz musicians while . . . living in the suburbs." Characterized as a "loser" by Becker, the song's subject was meant to reflect "a broken dream of a broken man living a broken life". In his 2013 memoir Eminent Hipsters, Fagen gives credit to Norman Mailer as inspiration for the narrator's persona:

On the origin of the song's name, Fagen says, it was inspired by football player Deacon Jones, as they like the sound of his name: "It also had two syllables, which was convenient, like 'Crimson. The song, however, is really about "the ultimate outsider, the flip side of the dream, boy-o . . . call me Deacon Blues."

Recording
"Deacon Blues" was recorded at Village Recorders in West Los Angeles. Jazz guitarist Larry Carlton used Fagen's demos to transcribe the chords into a rhythm section that featured Carlton's guitar on the song's opening. Saxophonist Tom Scott wrote the horn arrangements for not only "Deacon Blues" but for all of the songs on Aja, a task that he completed in less than two weeks. After the song was recorded, Becker and Fagen decided to add a saxophone solo. They asked their producer, Gary Katz, to arrange for Pete Christlieb to record the part. At the time, neither Becker nor Fagen knew Christlieb by name, only by his reputation as a musician on Johnny Carson's Tonight Show. Christlieb went to the studio and recorded the solo after taping the show one evening.

About its composition, Fagen later stated: "One thing we did right on 'Deacon Blues' and all of our records: we never tried to accommodate the mass market. We worked for ourselves and still do."

Reception and legacy
"Deacon Blues" was released on Steely Dan's 1977 album Aja which reached No.3 on Billboards album chart, a position it held for seven consecutive weeks. The song was the duo's fifth Top 20 hit on the Billboard Hot 100 chart in the US, where it peaked at #19 in 1978. "Deacon Blues" remained in the Top 40 for eight weeks. Billboard particularly praised the "outstanding" saxophone playing.  Cash Box praised the production, "jazzy guitar licks," lead vocals and "tasty keyboard touches."  Record World said from the masters of the complex lyric, musings on what it means to be an artist." Village Voice critic Robert Christgau wrote that "not only is "Deacon Blues" one of their strongest songs ever, it's also one of their warmest."

In a 1994 AOL chat interview, Becker discussed the inspiration for the song, "It was an outgrowth of a specific mood that pertained at a given time," and later added, "I remember the night that we mixed that one thinking that it was really good and wanting to hear it over and over which is never the case." Music critic Marc Myers writes "As midlife-crisis songs go, Steely Dan's 'Deacon Blues' ranks among the most melodic and existential."

The Scottish pop/rock band Deacon Blue took their name from this song. William Gibson's 1988 book Mona Lisa Overdrive features a gang called the Deacon Blues.

"Steely Blues" on Dan Deacon's 2015 album Gliss Riffer is named in reference to this song.

Singer-songwriters Bill Callahan and Will Oldham released a cover in 2020, which appeared on their 2021 album Blind Date Party.

Personnel

Walter Becker – bass
Donald Fagen – synthesizer, vocals
Larry Carlton, Lee Ritenour – guitar
Dean Parks – acoustic guitar
Pete Christlieb – tenor saxophone
Victor Feldman – electric piano
Bernard "Pretty" Purdie – drums
Venetta Fields – backup vocals
Clydie King – backup vocals
Sherlie Matthews – backup vocals

Chart history

Weekly charts

Year-end charts

References

External links
Lyrics of this song
 All Music Guide (4.5/5) link
Robert Christgau (B+) link
 

Steely Dan songs
1977 singles
Songs about loneliness
Songs written by Donald Fagen
Songs written by Walter Becker
ABC Records singles
1977 songs
Song recordings produced by Gary Katz